Casino: Love and Honor in Las Vegas is a 1995 non-fiction book by crime reporter Nicholas Pileggi that depicts the story of the alliance of Mafia mobsters Lefty Rosenthal and Tony Spilotro and their exploits working in Mafia controlled casinos in Las Vegas.

Summary
Casino covers the period through the seventies to early eighties when the Mafia controlled certain Las Vegas casinos. Today, it is believed that the major casinos are not influenced by the Mafia. Since the 1970s, the government has been very strict about keeping the mob out of the Vegas casinos. Pileggi focuses on the story of Frank "Lefty" Rosenthal, a Chicago bookmaker working for organized crime, and his friend, partner and also Mafia member, Anthony Spilotro. Rosenthal supervises the casino operations, while Spilotro provides protection, security and also masterminds jewelry raids that lead to his crew being nicknamed the Hole in the Wall Gang.

Critical reception
Kirkus Reviews called the book "riveting," writing that "Pileggi offers a blow-by-blow account of how organized crime looted the casinos they controlled as silent but deadly partners during the 1970s."

Film version
The book is the basis for the Academy Award-nominated 1995 film Casino directed by Martin Scorsese. The screenplay for Casino was by Pileggi and Scorsese. Although Pileggi had already written the book and wanted it published in advance of the film version, Scorsese tried to persuade him to forgo the usual chronology and to release the book after the film. However the book was released the month before the film came out.

The two main protagonists/antagonists of Rosenthal and Spilotro were portrayed as Ace Rothstein and Nicky Santoro by Robert De Niro and Joe Pesci. Sharon Stone, playing Rothstein's wife, Ginger (based on Geri McGee), was nominated for the Academy Award for Best Actress.

References

External links

1995 non-fiction books
Non-fiction books adapted into films
Non-fiction books about Italian-American organized crime
Works about the American Mafia